A list of horror films released in the 1940s.  After the success of Son of Frankenstein (1939), Universal horror caught a second wind and horror films continued to be produced at a feverish pace into the mid-1940s.  The early 1940s saw the debut of Lon Chaney Jr. and "The Wolf Man", both of which became fixtures in the Universal landscape.  Meanwhile, Dracula and Frankenstein's monster appeared in numerous sequels, often together in what was colloquially called "monster rally" films.

Hoping to present a viable alternative to the Universal juggernaut, RKO decided to embark on a series of its own horror films, starting with Cat People in 1942.  Led by producer Val Lewton and director Jacques Tourneur, this critically acclaimed series focused less on visible horrors and more on the psychological aspects of fear.

List

See also
 Lists of horror films

References

Citations

Bibliography

 
 
 

1940s
Horror